This is a list of United States Virgin Islander soccer clubs in North American competitions. U.S. Virgin Islands clubs have participated in competitive international soccer competitions since 1992, when Unique FC entered the 1992 CONCACAF Champions' Cup.

No club from the U.S. Virgin Islands has won a CONCACAF or CFU competition.

Results by competition

CONCACAF Champions Cup / Champions League

CFU Club Championship

Appearances in CONCACAF competitions

References

External links 
 RSSSF International Club Results for North America
US Virgin Islands - List of Champions, RSSSF.com

 
North American football clubs in international competitions